Seweryn Krajewski (born 3 January 1947, Nowa Sól, Poland) is a Polish singer and songwriter who rose to fame in the 1960s and 70s with the popular Polish band Czerwone Gitary. After leaving the group in 1997, he recorded several solo albums.

He has written songs for many popular Polish singers including Irena Jarocka, Maryla Rodowicz, Urszula Sipińska, Zdzisława Sośnicka, Edyta Geppert and many others.

Discography

Studio albums

Collaborative albums

Live albums

Compilation albums

Other releases

References

External links
 Official webpage of Seweryn Krajewski 

1947 births
Living people
People from Nowa Sól
Polish pop singers
Polish rock singers
20th-century Polish male singers
21st-century Polish male singers
21st-century Polish singers